Sambrook or Sambrooke may refer to:

Places
 Sambrook, Shropshire, a village in England

People with the surname
 Andrew Sambrook (born 1979), English footballer
 Clare Sambrook, English freelance journalist and author
 Gary Sambrook, Conservative MP for Birmingham Northfield since 2019
 Joseph Sambrook (born 1939), British molecular biologist 
 Richard Sambrook, Vice Chairman and Chief Content Officer of the Edelman public relations agency

Other uses
 Sambrooke Freeman (c. 1721 – 1782), member of the Freeman family of Fawley Court near Henley-on-Thames, England
 Sambrook's Brewery, a brewery in Battersea, London